Benjamin Hallowell (August 17, 1799 – September 7, 1877) was the first president of the Maryland Agricultural College.

Early life
Benjamin Hallowell was born in 1799. He went to school at the Westtown Boarding School.

Personal life
Hallowell met his wife Margaret, the sister of William Henry Farquhar, at Westtown School. They married around 1820 and she died in 1876. Together, they had three children:
 Henry C. Hallowell
 Caroline Hallowell Miller, wife of Francis Miller
 Benjamin Hallowell

He was friends with Henry Clay.

Career
In November 1819, he started his first official teaching position at Fair Hill Boarding School in Montgomery County, Maryland. In 1824, Hallowell opened a boarding school in Alexandria, Virginia, where his nephew Arthur Briggs Farquhar would later attend. His most famous student was Robert E. Lee who studied at the school for a month before entering West Point.

Hallowell was elected to the American Philosophical Society in 1854.

On October 4, 1859 Hallowell was appointed as the first president of the Maryland Agricultural College. He would only accept the appointment on condition that the College not use slaves and he would not accept a salary. He helped to develop the College's curriculum, which included Ancient Languages, Modern Languages, Natural Sciences, English, and Mathematics. After one month of serving as the president, he resigned due to illness.

Death

Hallowell was buried at the Sandy Spring Friends Meetinghouse cemetery.

References 

1799 births
1877 deaths
Hallowell family
People from Cheltenham, Pennsylvania
Presidents of the University of Maryland, College Park
Westtown School alumni